Anthocharis thoosa, the southwestern orangetip, is a butterfly which has a range mainly from the American Rocky Mountains down into Mexico. It is a member of the Anthocharis sara complex.

References 

Anthocharis
Butterflies of North America
Taxa named by Samuel Hubbard Scudder